Watch Rock Camp is a historic summer camp in Holderness, New Hampshire. Located off New Hampshire Route 113 on the shore of Squam Lake, the camp was built in 1926 for Herbert and Elizabeth Gallaudet; he was a scion of the founders of Gallaudet College. The camp was designed by New York City architect Francis Y. Joannes.

The camp was listed on the National Register of Historic Places in 2013.

See also
Camp Carnes
National Register of Historic Places listings in Grafton County, New Hampshire

References

Further reading

Houses on the National Register of Historic Places in New Hampshire
Houses completed in 1926
Houses in Grafton County, New Hampshire
National Register of Historic Places in Grafton County, New Hampshire
Holderness, New Hampshire
Squam Lake